Peter Michael Imbert, Baron Imbert,  (27 April 1933 – 13 November 2017) was Commissioner of the Metropolitan Police Service from 1987 to 1993, and prior to that appointment Chief Constable of Thames Valley Police from 1979 to 1985.

He was the Lord Lieutenant of Greater London from 1998 until 2008. He was made a life peer as Baron Imbert, of New Romney in the County of Kent in 1999, sitting as a crossbencher.

Early life
Born in Kent, Imbert was educated at the Harvey Grammar School in Folkestone, spent his National Service in the Royal Air Force Police and worked for a short time with Kent County Council, before joining the Metropolitan Police in 1953 at Bow Street Police Station.

In 1956, he married Iris Dove, with whom he had three children.

Metropolitan Police
In 1956, Imbert joined Special Branch, learning shorthand and Russian during his 17 years with the unit. In 1973, he was made deputy head of the Anti-Terrorist Branch, where he became an expert on European terrorist groups such as Baader-Meinhof, and gave lectures on hostage negotiation and counter-terrorism tactics.

Balcombe Street Siege
On 6 December 1975, four members of the Provisional IRA barricaded themselves in a flat in Balcombe Street, Marylebone with two hostages. The men had been responsible for a wave of bombings in London, but had been intercepted by armed police while attacking a restaurant.

Imbert was the chief negotiator over the six days of the Balcombe Street Siege, and when the situation ended peacefully with no lives lost and the four IRA members under arrest, Imbert was noted as a possible high-flyer in the police force.

Guildford Four case 
Imbert's role in interrogating the Guildford Four, convicted for the Guildford Pub Bombings of 5 October 1974, came under scrutiny after the four were released from jail in 1989. Lord Chief Justice Lane described the police investigation of the Guildford Four as a sequence of false confessions and police deceits. Imbert claimed to have believed the suspects' “confessions” which were made during an interrogation where they were subjected to violence and threats.

County forces
In 1976, Imbert left the Met and became Assistant Chief Constable, and later Deputy Chief Constable of Surrey Constabulary. In 1979, he became Chief Constable of Thames Valley Police, the youngest Chief Constable in the country at that time.

During his time at Thames Valley, Imbert allowed the BBC to make Police, a 1982 fly-on-the-wall documentary series about the police at work. The opposite of a public relations exercise, Thames Valley and the police in general came under sustained criticism when an episode of the programme showed three detectives interrogating and dismissing a rape victim. Shocked at the attitude and behaviour of his officers, and the public reaction, Imbert instigated improvements to the handling of rape cases to Thames Valley which were adopted throughout the country.

Return to London
Imbert returned to London in 1985 as Deputy Commissioner, becoming Commissioner in 1987.

Building on the reforms to the Met implemented by his predecessor, Sir Kenneth Newman, Imbert began his own set of reforms called the PLUS program, aiming to improve the corporate image and quality of service of the Met. The programme saw the Met renamed from the "Metropolitan Police Force" to the "Metropolitan Police Service", the name it has retained to this day. In addition, a Statement of Common Purpose and Values was devised.

Imbert suffered a heart attack in 1990, and took six months off duty. Further illness in 1992 led to his retirement from the police on 31 January 1993.

Honours
Awarded the Queen's Police Medal (QPM) in 1980, Imbert was knighted in 1988.

Imbert was created Deputy Lieutenant of Greater London in 1994, and Lord Lieutenant in 1998, an office he held until 2008.

He was created a life peer on 10 February 1999, taking the title Baron Imbert, of New Romney in the county of Kent.

He was appointed a Commander of the Royal Victorian Order (CVO) in the 2008 New Year Honours List.

Imbert Prize 

Lord Imbert was a patron of the Association of Security Consultants (ASC), which has awarded the Imbert Prize annually since 2005. The prize is awarded for the development of ideas for the advancement of risk and security management in the UK. It consists of three categories: 1) Best academic dissertation, 2) Most notable contribution in the security industry in the preceding year and 3) The ASC member that has made the most significant contribution to independent security consultancy.
Between 1983 and 2001 Baron Imbert served on the academic consultative committee at Cumberland Lodge.

References

General

 https://www.nytimes.com/1990/02/25/magazine/when-british-justice-failed.html?pagewanted=all&src=pm

External links
Announcement of his introduction at the House of Lords House of Lords minutes of proceedings, 23 February 1999
Announcement of his retirement in the House of Commons, House of Commons Hansard Debates, 23 October 1992
Photographic portrait of Imbert in the National Portrait Gallery

1933 births
2017 deaths
Commissioners of Police of the Metropolis
Crossbench life peers
Deputy Lieutenants of Greater London
Knights Bachelor
Lord-Lieutenants of Greater London
Commanders of the Royal Victorian Order
Knights of Justice of the Order of St John
English recipients of the Queen's Police Medal
People educated at The Harvey Grammar School
Life peers created by Elizabeth II